is a Japanese anime director. After debuting in 1985, he has directed many series, including the anime adaptation of Kamichu!, which won an excellence award at the Japan Media Arts Festival in 2005, the anime adaptation of Magi: The Labyrinth of Magic, and the anime adaptation of Blue Period.

Biography
Koji Masunari was born in Shimane Prefecture on January 1, 1965. In 2005, Masunari directed the anime adaptation of Kamichu!, which was won the excellence award at the 2005 Japan Media Arts Festival. In 2012, he directed the anime adaptation of Magi: The Labyrinth of Magic, which was ranked by IGN as one of the best anime of the 2010s.

Works

Television series
 Android Announcer Maico 2010 (1998) (director)
  (1999-2000) (director)
  (2001-2002) (director)
 R.O.D the TV (2003–2004)
  (2005) (director)
  (2012–2014) (director)
  (2021–present) (chief director)

Original video animation
  (1997–1999) (director)
 Read or Die (2001–2002) (director)

Films
  (2010) (director)

References

External links
 

1965 births
Anime directors
Japanese film directors
Japanese television directors
Living people
People from Shimane Prefecture